The Scott Holland Memorial Lectures are held in memory of Henry Scott Holland. They are given by a prominent Anglican scholar of religion and society in the United Kingdom.

Previous lectures

Notes

External links 
 http://www.scotthollandtrust.org.uk/category/lectures/

Anglicanism
British lecture series
Religious education in the United Kingdom